Teemu Ramstedt (born ) is a Finnish professional ice hockey centre who is currently playing for SaiPa of the Finnish Liiga.

Playing career
Ramstedt as a youth played bandy along with ice hockey until Junior C. He won the championship with HIFK in Junior E and Junior C.

In the 2016–17 season, Ramstedt continued his career abroad, returning to the Kontinental Hockey League in playing for his second Russian club, Amur Khabarovsk.

After registering 25 points in 49 games with Khabarovsk, Ramstedt continued in the KHL, agreeing to a one-year deal with HC Slovan Bratislava for the 2017–18 season on 1 August 2017. His contract was terminated in late September after two scoreless games with Bratislava, opting to return to the Liiga in agreeing to a contract for the remainder of the season with Lukko on 27 November 2017. He returned to his previous form in recording 9 goals and 22 points in 34 regular season games.

Career statistics

References

External links

1987 births
Living people
AIK IF players
Amur Khabarovsk players
Espoo Blues players
Finnish ice hockey centres
HIFK (ice hockey) players
KooKoo players
Lukko players
SKA Saint Petersburg players
HC Slovan Bratislava players
HC TPS players
SaiPa players
Ice hockey people from Helsinki
Finnish expatriate ice hockey players in Slovakia
Finnish expatriate ice hockey players in Russia
Finnish expatriate ice hockey players in Sweden